The 2009–10 Cypriot Fourth Division was the 25th season of the Cypriot fourth-level football league. Enosis Neon Parekklisia won their 1st title.

Format
Fifteen teams participated in the 2009–10 Cypriot Fourth Division. All teams played against each other twice, once at their home and once away. The team with the most points at the end of the season crowned champions. The first three teams were promoted to the 2010–11 Cypriot Third Division and the last four teams were relegated to regional leagues.

Point system
Teams received three points for a win, one point for a draw and zero points for a loss.

Changes from previous season
Teams promoted to 2009–10 Cypriot Third Division
 Achyronas Liopetriou
 ENAD Polis Chrysochous
 Iraklis Gerolakkou

Teams relegated from 2008–09 Cypriot Third Division
 Anagennisi Trachoniou
 Orfeas Nicosia
 Olympos Xylofagou

Teams promoted from regional leagues
 Ethnikos Latsion FC
 Karmiotissa Pano Polemidion
 Ormideia FC

Teams relegated to regional leagues
 Sourouklis Troullon
 APEP Pelendriou
 Dafni Troulloi

Notes:
AEK Kythreas also participated in the 2009–10 Cypriot Fourth Division. AEK's relegation during 2006–07 Cypriot Fourth Division forced the team to suspend operations. The team resumed operations in the 2009–10 season. According to a specific regulation, the refugees football clubs that were resuming their operations could participate in the Cypriot Fourth Division. So, AEK's application to participate in the fourth division was accepted.

Stadia and locations

League standings

Results

See also
 Cypriot Fourth Division
 2009–10 Cypriot First Division
 2009–10 Cypriot Cup for lower divisions
 Cypriot football league system

References

Sources
 

Cypriot Fourth Division seasons
Cyprus
2009–10 in Cypriot football